Rose Hill Marple railway station is in Marple in the Metropolitan Borough of Stockport, England. The station, which opened in 1869, is the last surviving stop on the former Macclesfield, Bollington and Marple Railway (MB&MR). It is connected via a short branch to the Hope Valley Line. The original line to Macclesfield closed in January 1970, leaving Rose Hill Marple as the terminus of the route. Daily services run to Manchester Piccadilly, via the Hyde loop; there is no service on Sundays.

The station provides access to the Middlewood Way, which follows the preserved route of the disused MB&MR.

History
The station opened on 2 August 1869. Originally named Marple (Rose Hill), it was later renamed Rose Hill (Marple), before the current form Rose Hill Marple was adopted.

It was built on the Macclesfield, Bollington and Marple Railway, with dual tracks and thus two platforms. The second southbound platform (now removed, as the line is operated as a single track 'long siding') had simply a waiting shelter. The remaining station building previously provided an indoor waiting area and was only recently brought back into use in 2007, with a new ticket window operating on weekday mornings.

On 5 January 1970, the route south to Bollington and Macclesfield was closed to all traffic; the majority of travellers between Macclesfield and the City of Manchester preferring to use the faster West Coast Main Line route via Stockport instead.  Though it had also been listed for closure in the 1963 Beeching Report, Rose Hill itself avoided a similar fate due to its high levels of commuter traffic towards Manchester Piccadilly.

Subsequent diesel services to and from Manchester Piccadilly originally alternated between the two available routes: one train running via Bredbury, followed by a train travelling via Hyde and Guide Bridge. In the late 1990s, the services to the two railway stations in Marple were streamlined, with most Rose Hill services now running via Hyde and most Marple services running via the more direct Bredbury line.

From 13 December 2010, Rose Hill Marple gained an extra second service per hour off-peak due to the diversion of a service which previously turned back at Marple railway station. Daytime Monday to Saturday, there are a half-hourly services to Manchester Piccadilly, via the Hyde loop, with some peak period additional trains via Bredbury.  The evening service from the station is limited, with just two departures after 19.15. There is no Sunday service.

Most services since the late 1980s have been operated with Class 142 Pacer diesel multiple units but, given their withdrawal from service in 2019/20, they are now run by Class 150s, Class 156s and Class 195s.

In July 2020, Northern informed local residents that services between Manchester Piccadilly and Rose Hill Marple would not operate between 14 September and 14 December 2020, due to the impact of the COVID-19 pandemic on their operations. Although disruption occurred, the service is now running again frequently.

Facilities

Rose Hill Marple is a Park & Ride station.

The station has a ticket office open on weekday mornings until 12:30pm; there is also a ticket machine at the station. The covered area provides a shelter with a three-seater bench. The original waiting room can be accessed during ticket office opening hours.

Railway Road gives access to Middlewood Way, a linear park and trail for walkers, cyclists and horse-riders, which follows the line's previous route to Macclesfield. The initial section of this route was tarmacked and given street lighting in 2006; this was to encourage its use by residents of local residential developments in reaching the station and Stockport Road.

In addition to exposed railings around the station area, three secure bicycle lockers are provided at the north end of the platform, which require a 'BLUC' key for use.

Future planning
As part of Manchester's Transport Innovation Fund (TIF) bid, which would have seen a weekday peak time congestion charge introduced on roads into the city centre, Rose Hill was among the stations listed to receive station improvements and improved services from the proposed £3bn injection into the region's public transport. This scheme was dropped after the plans were rejected substantially in a public referendum in December 2008.

Rose Hill Marple has been touted as a suitable terminus for a new Metrolink tram service to the area, with possible routes being either a simple conversion of the existing line to Manchester or a new link into Stockport town centre via Bredbury and Portwood. The latter would provide an Eastern extension from the proposed Western link into Stockport town centre from Didsbury, linking together many towns in the borough along the Goyt and Mersey rivers. Despite heavy road traffic from private cars and buses, the local centres of Marple, Romiley and Bredbury have not been linked to their borough centre of Stockport by a direct passenger rail route since January 1967.

The bid was unsuccessful, but a further bid in 2021 has been accepted. A consultation on the link was launched in June 2022 for a new service from Rose Hill Marple to Stockport via Reddish South which would involve a new chord in the Reddish Vale Country Park area.

References

External links

Episode 4 of Beeching's Tracks broadcast on BBC Four on 11 December 2008

Railway stations in the Metropolitan Borough of Stockport
DfT Category E stations
Former Macclesfield Committee stations
Railway stations in Great Britain opened in 1869
Northern franchise railway stations
1869 establishments in England
Marple, Greater Manchester